Jenoptik AG is a Jena, Germany-based integrated photonics group. The company is listed on the Frankfurt Stock Exchange and is included in the TecDAX stock index.

History 
The group can trace its heritage back to the original Carl Zeiss AG company, founded in Jena in 1846. Following World War II, Jena fell within the Soviet occupation zone, later to become East Germany. In 1948, when it was apparent that the Soviet authorities were moving toward establishing a separate Communist state in their occupation zone, most of the main Zeiss company hastily relocated to West Germany.  The Soviet and East German authorities took over the old Zeiss factory in Jena and used it as the nucleus for the state-owned Kombinat VEB Zeiss Jena.  The Eastern Zeiss became well known for its high-quality optical equipment.

Following German reunification, VEB Zeiss Jena became Zeiss Jena GmbH. The company then sold its microscopy division and other optical divisions to Carl Zeiss AG, effectively reuniting the old prewar Zeiss firm. In 1991, the remainder of Zeiss Jena GmbH continued as Jenoptik Carl Zeiss Jena GmbH, owned by the state government of Thuringia specializing in the areas of photonics, optoelectronics, and mechatronics. The name was shortened to Jenoptik GmbH, and was renamed Jenoptik AG in 1996 when the state divested its interest.  The JENOPTIK trademark is owned by Jenoptik AG. Jenoptik is regarded as one of the few companies descended from an East German state-owned enterprise to be successful in the post-Reunification era.  Indeed, it was one of the few East German firms that was thought to have a realistic chance of competing in a global market.

In 2004, Concord Camera Corp. of the United States acquired a related company Jenimage Europe GmbH, and licensed the right to use the Jenoptik trademark for 20 years. It produced a range of compact digital cameras under the Jenoptik brand.

In August 2017, the company announced it would acquire the American-based process automation firm, Five Lakes, merging the company with its laser-machine business.

In 2018, Jenoptik acquired Prodomax Automation Ltd., a Canadian manufacturer of automated production lines, to add to their technology portfolio of laser processing and automation.

After Jenoptik announced in July 2019 to aim for a sale of this company division to concentrate the core business with lasers, measurement technology and optical systems, Vincorion was sold to a Fund of the British financial investor Star Capital Partnership in November 2021. Jenoptik indicated a company value of 130 million euros.

As of September 2020, Jenoptik acquired the Hamburg-based optics group TRIOPTICS, an international supplier of test equipment and manufacturing systems for optical components and digitalization. In late 2021, the company acquired BG Medical Applications GmbH, a supplier of precision optical components for the medical technology sector, and the SwissOptic Group, a developer and manufacturer of optical components and assemblies for the medical technology, semiconductor and metrology sectors.

As a partner in NASA's Mars 2020 mission, Jenoptik produced lens assemblies for the engineering cameras of the Mars rover, Perseverance, which began its expedition on Mars in February 2021. In November 2021, Jenoptik became a member of the United Nations Global Compact network for corporate responsibility and committed to compliance with integrating aspects of the Sustainable Development Goals into its business strategies."

In December 2021, the company released a new business strategy, Agenda 2025 'More Value,' and an organizational restructuring took effect in April 2022. The group focused its operations on purely photonics technologies by consolidating its three prior divisions into two: "Advanced Photonics Solutions" and "Smart Mobility Solutions." Since the 2022 restructuring, Jenoptik's primary markets are the semiconductor equipment and electronics, life science and medical technology, and traffic and security industries. Its non-photonic activities, particularly within the automotive market, operate within the group's "Non-Photonic Portfolio Companies.

Operations
As of 2021, Jenoptik reported about 4,900 employees and sales of 895 million Euros. Since June 1998 Jenoptik has been listed on the Frankfurt Stock Exchange and is included in the TecDAX index.  The Jenoptik Group headquarters are in Jena (Thuringia). In addition to several major sites in Germany, Jenoptik has offices in 80 countries and major production sites in the US, France and Switzerland. It owns significant stakes in companies in Singapore, India, China, Korea, Japan and Australia.

The company's customers include companies in the semiconductor equipment; electronics; life science and medical technology; and traffic and security industries.

Dr. Stefan Traeger has been the chairman of the executive board of Jenoptik AG since May 1, 2017. Hans-Dieter Schumacher is the chief financial officer.

References

External links

Companies based in Thuringia
Jena
Optics manufacturing companies
Electronics companies of Germany
German brands
Medical technology companies of Germany
Photonics companies
Companies in the TecDAX